China News may refer to:
Taiwan News, formerly known as China News, English language newspaper in Taiwan
China News (CCTV), a news program of CCTV-4
China News Service, state-owned news agency in the People's Republic of China